Mohammed Goyi Aliyu (born February 12, 1993) is a Nigerian football player.

Career
Aliyu began to play football at Lima Primary School and joined in 2008 to Niger Tornadoes who earned his first professional matches. In January 2011 left Nigerian club Niger Tornadoes and signed for Primera División side Villarreal C.F. On December 13, 2011 he signed a long-term contract for Ukrainian Premier League club Tavriya.

International career
He was called from Sam John Obuh for the Nigeria national under-17 football team for the 2009 FIFA U-17 World Cup. Obuh called the defender on 12 April 2011 for the 2011 African Youth Championship in South Africa.

References

External links
 
 

1993 births
Living people
Nigerian footballers
SC Tavriya Simferopol players
Shooting Stars S.C. players
Association football midfielders
Villarreal CF players
Niger Tornadoes F.C. players
FC Saxan players
FC Dinamo Tbilisi players
Ukrainian Premier League players
Moldovan Super Liga players
Erovnuli Liga players
2013 African U-20 Championship players
Nigerian expatriate footballers
Expatriate footballers in Spain
Nigerian expatriate sportspeople in Spain
Expatriate footballers in Ukraine
Nigerian expatriate sportspeople in Ukraine
Expatriate footballers in Croatia
Nigerian expatriate sportspeople in Croatia
Expatriate footballers in Moldova
Nigerian expatriate sportspeople in Moldova
Expatriate footballers in Georgia (country)
Nigerian expatriate sportspeople in Georgia (country)